Kaleb Nation (born September 16, 1988) is an American writer and YouTube personality. He currently resides in Los Angeles, California.

Writing career

2009–2010
Nation began writing his first novel at the age of 14 on the night of March 3, 2003. Following six years of writing, Nation's novel Bran Hambric: The Farfield Curse was published by Sourcebooks and Scholastic on September 9, 2009, in the United States, the United Kingdom, and Canada. The book was translated into Portuguese by Panini Brazil and into Russian by Eksmo, under the title "Bran Hembrik: i proklyate Farfilda" and author name "Kaleb Neyshn".

In 2010, the second book in the "Bran Hambric" series was published, titled Bran Hambric: The Specter Key.

2011–present
In November 2011, Nation completed his first novel for young adults. The book was called a "supernatural conspiracy theory novel". Harken was published on January 13, 2013.

Television 

On January 30, 2014, Kaleb Nation appeared in a segment of the nightly TV news program Dr. Drew On Call on HLN called "Hooked: Social Media Stars." Kaleb was later added as a regular commentator focussing on social media trends.

In May 2014, Kaleb made a cameo appearance in a national television ad campaign for Taco Bell.

In June 2015, Kaleb and his fiancée Taylor Elizabeth were featured on Good Morning America for a segment about online relationships.

On January 8, 2016, Nation appeared in an episode of TLC's Say Yes to the Dress: Atlanta titled "A Little Sparkle Goes A Long Way" featuring his wedding to fellow YouTube personality Taylor Elizabeth (bfftaylor).

Radio 

Nation hosted his first radio show at age 13 in Austin, Texas, under the pseudonym Kaleb Krew. By age 17, Nation's show was nationally syndicated and broadcast in over 20 states and countries. The show ended in 2009 after Nation's first novel was published.

YouTube 

Nation began his career as a viral video producer on YouTube in 2009. , Nation's YouTube channel "kalebnation" has 74,000 subscribers and 49 million video views.

His second channel "60SR" has over 18,000 subscribers and 12 million video views. In May 2012, Nation announced that his channel "60SR" had joined digital media company PMC to become a daily, 60-second entertainment web show. The show ended regular production in August 2013.

In 2011, Nation appeared on stage at YouTube convention Playlist Live with a panel of authors. He is a regular attendee of YouTube convention VidCon.

In August 2013, Nation was chosen by Taco Bell to be the company's official correspondent at the 2013 MTV Video Music Awards.

Business 

In 2013, Nation founded online marketing agency Kaleb Media.

Other work 

From 2009 to 2011, Nation wrote for TwilightGuy.com, a website dedicated to the Twilight series of books by Stephenie Meyer. The website was featured in BusinessWeek and Entertainment Weekly. Nation also appeared in the documentary Twilight in Forks: The Saga of the Real Town  and was profiled by the Huffington Post when a parody he posted of Pottermore became a viral hit.

In May 2012, Nation starred in Princess Charming, the music video by Megan and Liz.

In December 2013, Nation made a cameo appearance in Rebecca Black's "Saturday" music video. He has appeared in other music videos for artists including Sleeper Agent, Lindsey Stirling, Taryn Southern, Dave Days, and Who Is Fancy.

Personal life 

Nation resides in Los Angeles, California with a chinchilla named Chilla and a puppy named Selfie. He is married to fellow YouTube personality Taylor Elizabeth Nation, whom he met in 2010 at YouTube convention Playlist Live and began dating in 2012 at YouTube convention Vidcon. On June 7, 2014, Nation proposed at YouTube convention Digifest in New York City on stage in front of a crowd of over 12,000.

Nation attended the University of Texas but left after signing his first book deal. He is a black belt in taekwondo.

Books
 Bran Hambric: The Farfield Curse (2009)
 Bran Hembrik: i proklyate Farfilda (2010)
 Bran Hambric: The Specter Key (2010)
 Harken (2013)

See also
 Viral marketing
 Internet Celebrity
 Entrepreneurs

References

External links
 Official website
 Trapped Between Life And Death, Kaleb Nation's article on Gayle Foreman's "If I Stay"

Living people
1988 births
YouTubers from Texas
Novelists from Texas
21st-century American novelists
American radio hosts
American male novelists
University of Texas alumni
American male taekwondo practitioners
21st-century American male writers
American young adult novelists
Writers from Los Angeles